The Pesky Pants prank was an ongoing practical joke between 1965 and 1989.  Two brothers-in-law took turns giving each other the same pair of trousers as a Christmas present with the packaging become more elaborate each year.  The prank ended in 1989 with the accidental destruction of the pants.

Origin 
The pants, made of moleskin, were originally given to Larry Kunkel by his mother in 1964.  Kunkel disliked the pants because the material became uncomfortably stiff in the cold Minnesota winters.  Rather than throw them away, he regifted them to his brother-in-law, Roy Collette, the following Christmas.  Collette didn't like them either so he waited until the following year and gave them back. For the next couple years, the pants were traded back and forth with traditional wrapping.

Escalation & Gentleman's Agreement 
After several years, Collette took the additional step of twisting the pants tightly and stuffing them into a tube to conceal the nature of the present.  Kunkel retaliated by compressing them into a small cube approximately seven inches square and wrapping it with wire.

As the packaging became more elaborate, the goal shifted to making the gift harder for the recipient to open and recover the pants.

An informal agreement existed that only “legal and moral” methods of wrapping were permitted and expenses were kept to a minimum by using junk parts and donated supplies. They also agreed to end the tradition if the pants were destroyed or became unwearable.

Double-crosses 
On two occasions, the men agreed to end the tradition early.  In 1984, they planned to mount the trousers in a glass frame and present them back to Kunkel's mother Ethel Kunkel.  Collette had the trousers professionally cleaned and pressed and delivered them to Kunkel for framing.  Kunkel instead returned the pants to Collette in a 1974 Chevrolet Camaro filled with concrete.

Again, in 1987 they agreed to end the saga, this time by destroying the pants with media present.  They arranged an event where the pants would be secured between their vehicles and torn in two. Kunkel managed to sabotage the rope and made off with the trousers intact.  They were returned to Collette the following year.

List of Gift Years

Destruction 
In 1989 Collette intended to encase the pants in 10,000 pounds of poured molten glass. During the pouring process, the pants were to be protected by an insulated container.  However, the container fractured allowing the pants to burn. The ashes were deposited into a brass urn and given to Kunkel ending the tradition.

Name and Media Coverage 
The story was first reported in the Owatonna People's Press in a story that used the name 'Pesky Pants'

In subsequent years, the prank was covered by many newspapers including New York Times and Chicago Tribune, radio programs and TV news.  

On 9 October 1988 the two appeared on Incredible Sunday.

External links 

 Snopes.com
 Today I Found Out: The Story of How Two Friends Elaborately Re-Gifted the Same Pair of Pants for Over Two Decades
 Futility Closet:  The Christmas War

References 

Practical jokes
Trousers and shorts